Guy Santy (born 23 November 1950) is a French former racing cyclist. He rode in the 1972 Tour de France.

Major results
1971
 1st Tour du Condroz
 2nd Paris–Bourges
 6th Overall Grand Prix du Midi Libre
1972
 8th Overall Grand Prix de Fourmies
1975
 3rd Grand Prix de Plouay

References

1950 births
Living people
French male cyclists